Eric Ioan Emlyn Whitman (31 July 1909 — 5 December 1990) was a Welsh cricketer and teacher.

Early life
Whitman was born in Barry, Glamorgan.

Cricket
Whitman, who had taken up cricket in university, played club cricket for Barry Cricket Club.  He was a right-handed batsman and a right-arm medium-pace bowler who played two first-class games for Glamorgan during the 1932 season, appearing in the lower order in both games.

Military service
Whitman served as a Pilot Officer in the Royal Air Force during World War II, leaving the service on 27 June 1945.

Teaching career
Following the end of his cricketing career, Whitman became a school teacher.  By 1951 he was teaching at Bournemouth School.  In 1958 he became the first headmaster of Aldridge Grammar School where he remained until his retirement in 1974.

Marriage
Whitman married Madge Trowell in East Glamorgan in 1936.

Death
Whitman died in Norwich, Norfolk on 5 December 1990, aged 81.

External links

Eric Whitman at Cricket Archive 

1909 births
1990 deaths
Cambridgeshire cricketers
Glamorgan cricketers
Sportspeople from Barry, Vale of Glamorgan
Cricketers from the Vale of Glamorgan
Welsh cricketers
Heads of schools in England